Little Britches: Father and I Were Ranchers is an autobiographical account of Ralph Moody's (1898–1982) early life in the vicinity of Littleton, Colorado. This is the first book in the very popular series on Moody's life. This book has been in print continuously since 1950.

One valued lesson passed on by Moody is the importance of water rights and the profound challenges these can have on a community.

This book spans the years from 1906 to 1910. Moody was eight when his father moved to Colorado, and eleven when his father died.

The book was the basis for the 1970 Disney film The Wild Country.

Editions
New York: W.W. Norton & Company, 1950.
New York: W.W. Norton & Company, 1962.
Cutchogue, NY: Buccaneer Books (reprint edition), 1986. 
Lincoln: University of Nebraska Press, 1991. 
Spokane, WA: Books In Motion, 2000. Audiobook 
Cynthiana, KY:  Purple House Press (hardcover reprint), Oct 2017.

References

External links
Little Britches - University of Nebraska Press
Little Britches hardcover - Purple House Press
Ralph Owen Moody – Biography
New York Times Review – The Wild Country

1950 non-fiction books
American autobiographies
History of Colorado
History books about the American Old West